Henry Savile (1642 – 6 October 1687) was an English courtier, diplomat and Member of Parliament.

Savile was born at Rufford in Nottinghamshire, the third son of Sir William Savile, 3rd Baronet and his wife Anne Coventry. His elder brother was George Savile, 1st Marquess of Halifax.

He served as Groom of the Bedchamber to the Duke of York from 1665 to 1672 and to King Charles II from 1673 to 1678. During this time, he was also made envoy-extraordinary to France between 1672 and 1673 and between 1678 and 1682.

In 1673, he was elected Member of Parliament in an irregular election for Newark, which was eventually declared void in 1677. In the subsequent by-election Savile was properly re-elected, sitting until 1679. He was elected again in 1685, sitting until 1687.

In 1680, he was appointed Vice-Chamberlain of the Household. In 1687 he went to Paris for a surgical operation, but died there.

He was a close friend of John Wilmot, 2nd Earl of Rochester.

See also
Savile Baronets, of Thornhill (1611)

References

1642 births
1687 deaths
Younger sons of baronets
People from Newark and Sherwood (district)
17th-century English diplomats
Lords of the Admiralty
English MPs 1661–1679
English MPs 1685–1687